The Fencing competition in the 2005 Summer Universiade were held in İzmir, Turkey.

Medal overview

Men's events

Women's events

Medal table

References
 Universiade fencing medalists on HickokSports

2005 Summer Universiade
Universiade
2005
International fencing competitions hosted by Turkey